Events in the year 2021 in Liechtenstein.

Incumbents 
 Prince: Hans-Adam II
 Regent: Alois
 Prime Minister: Adrian Hasler (until 25 March), Daniel Risch (from 25 March)

Events 
Ongoing – COVID-19 pandemic in Liechtenstein
 7 February – The 2021 Liechtenstein general election were held, electing 25 members of the Landtag.
 25 March – Daniel Risch became the nation's 14th Prime Minister after taking over the position from Adrian Hasler.
 25 May – The 2020–21 Liechtenstein Cup semifinals and finals were canceled due scheduling reasons.

Sports

2021–22 Liechtenstein Cup

First Round 
 28 September
 FC Vaduz III 1 – 3 FC Balzers II
 FC Schaan II 5 – 4 FC Triesen II
 FC Ruggell II 2 – 2  USV Eschen/Mauren II
 29 September
 FC Triesenberg II 0 – 1 USV Eschen/Mauren III

Second Round 
 29 October
 FC Ruggell II 2 – 0 USV Eschen/Mauren III
 2 November
 FC Schaan II 0 – 6 FC Triesen
 3 November
 FC Balzers II 0 – 2 FC Vaduz II
 10 November
 FC Triesenberg 1 – 2 FC Schaan

Deaths 
 21 August – Countess Marie Kinsky of Wchinitz and Tettau (b. 1940)

See also 

 COVID-19 pandemic in Europe
 2021 in Europe
 City states

References 

 
2020s in Liechtenstein
Years of the 21st century in Liechtenstein
Liechtenstein
Liechtenstein